The John Frew House, also or formerly known as the Rachel and Robert Sterrett House, is an historic house in the Westwood neighborhood of Pittsburgh, Pennsylvania.

History
Of the five extant pre-1800 structures remaining in the City of Pittsburgh, the John Frew House is the only one that is currently being used as an occupied house. Its location on Poplar Street places it on the City of Pittsburgh side of the border between Crafton and Pittsburgh.

The original stone section of the house and the adjacent stone springhouse were built circa 1790. The Greek Revival addition to the house was built circa 1840. A garage was then added to the springhouse circa 1950.

Preservation of the home began in the 1930s. 

It was subsequently listed on the National Register of Historic Places in 2001. The house also has a landmark plaque from the Pittsburgh History and Landmarks Foundation, and it was added to the List of Pittsburgh History and Landmarks Foundation Historic Landmarks in 1984.

References

Houses on the National Register of Historic Places in Pennsylvania
Colonial Revival architecture in Pennsylvania
Houses completed in 1790
Houses in Pittsburgh
Pittsburgh History & Landmarks Foundation Historic Landmarks
National Register of Historic Places in Pittsburgh